Miss Universe Malaysia 2011, the 45th edition of the Miss Universe Malaysia, was held on 27 January 2011 at Gardens Mall, Kuala Lumpur. Deborah Henry of Kuala Lumpur was crowned by the outgoing titleholder, Nadine Ann Thomas of Selangor at the end of the event. She then represented Malaysia at the Miss Universe 2011 pageant in São Paulo, Brazil.

References

2011 beauty pageants
2011 in Malaysia
2011
Women in Kuala Lumpur